The following contains the team rosters for the 2017 Asia Professional Baseball Championship in Tokyo, Japan.

Manager: 2 Hong I-chung
Coaches: 53 Huang Kan-lin, 91 Chiu Chang-jung, 34 Lin Cheng-feng, 93 Kuo Chien-lin, 3 Wu Chun-liang, 63 Tsai Yu-hsiang

Manager: 2 Atsunori Inaba
Coaches: 88 Makoto Kaneko, 81 Yoshinori Tateyama, 84 Yoshinori Murata, 82 Hirokazu Ibata, 87 Masaji Shimizu

Manager: 90 Sun Dong-yol
Coaches: 71 Lee Kang-chul, 77 Lee Jong-beom, 76 Ryu Ji-hyun, 72 Jung Min-chul, 88 Kim Jae-hyun, 92 Jin Kab-yong

References

External links

Asia Professional Baseball Championship
Baseball tournament squads